
Year 514 (DXIV) was a common year starting on Wednesday (link will display the full calendar) of the Julian calendar. At the time, it was known as the Year of the Consulship of Cassiodorus without colleague (or, less frequently, year 1267 Ab urbe condita). The denomination 514 for this year has been used since the early medieval period, when the Anno Domini calendar era became the prevalent method in Europe for naming years.

Events 
 By place 
 Byzantine Empire 
 Vitalian, Byzantine general, marches again to Constantinople. A fleet of 200 vessels sails from the Black Sea ports and blockades the entrance of the harbor capital. Emperor Anastasius I is disquieted by riots in the city, which cost many casualties, and decides to negotiate with Vitalian.
 Vitalian accepts the receipt of ransom money and gifts worth 5,000 pounds of gold for the release of Hypatius, a nephew of Anastasius I who has been a prisoner since the attack at Acris (see 513). Vitalian retreats back to Lower Moesia.

 Britannia 
 Cissa of Sussex becomes king of the South Saxons after his father's death (approximate date).

 Asia 
 Beopheung becomes king of the Korean kingdom of Silla.

 By topic 
 Religion 
 July 19 – Pope Symmachus dies at Rome after a 16-year reign, and is succeeded by Hormisdas as the 52nd pope.

Births

Deaths 
 July 19 – Pope Symmachus
 Aelle of Sussex, king of Sussex (approximate date)
 Jayavarman, king of Funan (Cambodia)
 Mac Nisse, bishop of Connor

References